Andriy Korobenko (born 28 May 1997) is a Ukrainian footballer currently playing as a midfielder for Inhulets Petrove.

Career
He is a product of the FC Shakhtar Donetsk Youth Sportive Academy.

Korobenko made his debut for FC Shakhtar in the match against FC Volyn Lutsk on 21 November 2015 in the Ukrainian Premier League. On 13 November 2020, there were rumors that Desna Chernihiv was interested.

References

External links
 
 

1997 births
Living people
Footballers from Chernihiv
Ukrainian footballers
Association football midfielders
FC Shakhtar Donetsk players
FC Chornomorets Odesa players
FC Mariupol players
FC Rukh Lviv players
FC Inhulets Petrove players
Ukrainian Premier League players
Ukrainian First League players